Michael Pope (born 11 December 1962) is an Australian voice-over announcer, warm-up comedian, and producer, best known as a producer of Nine Network's Bert's Family Feud as well as The Price Is Right on the same network. He has also hosted shows—such as Seven Network's Blockbusters and Total Recall—and worked as an announcer and presenter on Network Ten's Battle of the Sexes.

He has "warmed up" the audience on numerous occasions for all major Australian Networks, including the shows The AFL Footy Show, Who Wants to Be a Millionaire, Talkin' 'Bout Your Generation, So You Think You Can Dance, Dancing with The Stars, Australia's Got Talent, The Logies, the Arias, and Q&A.

Pope also works as an MC for corporate functions.

References

 Michael Pope official site

Australian game show hosts
Australian male voice actors
Living people
1962 births